Luisa Corna (born 2 December 1965) is an Italian television presenter, singer, model, and actress.

Born in Palazzolo sull'Oglio, Brescia, at 16 years old Corna began her career as a model for, among others, Dolce & Gabbana,  Missoni and Mariella Burani; she also posed for photographers Helmut Newton and Arthur Elgort. In 1992 she ranked second at the Castrocaro Music Festival with the song "Dove vanno a finire gli amori". In 2002 she entered the main competition at the Sanremo Music Festival,  ranking fourth with the song "Ora che ho bisogno di te", a duet with Fausto Leali.

Corna also appeared on several films and television series, and dubbed in the Italian version of the animated film Shark Tale.

References

External links 

1965 births
Living people
Mass media people from the Province of Brescia
Italian television presenters
Italian film actresses
Italian television actresses
Italian female models
Italian pop singers
Italian women singers
Italian women television presenters